Kerry Anthony Parker (born October 3, 1955 in New Orleans, Louisiana) was a football player in the CFL for seven years. Parker played defensive back for the British Columbia Lions and Toronto Argonauts from 1980-1987. Parker also played part of two seasons in the National Football League. He played college football at Grambling State University and attended high school at Carver Senior High School in New Orleans. 

1955 births
Living people
Grambling State Tigers football players
BC Lions players
Toronto Argonauts players
Hamilton Tiger-Cats players
Kansas City Chiefs players
Buffalo Bills players
American players of Canadian football
Canadian football defensive backs
American football defensive backs